Richard Croft may refer to:

Richard Croft (MP) for Herefordshire (UK Parliament constituency)
Richard Croft (tenor), American tenor
Sir Richard Croft, 6th Baronet (1762–1818), English physician to the British Royal Family
Lord Richard Croft, Tomb Raider character